Earl Cyril Palmer (October 25, 1924 – September 19, 2008) was an American drummer. Considered one of the inventors of rock and roll, he is a member of the Rock and Roll Hall of Fame.

Palmer was one of the most prolific studio musicians of all time and played on thousands of recordings, including nearly all of Little Richard's hits, all of Fats Domino's hits, "You've Lost That Lovin' Feelin'" by the Righteous Brothers, and a long list of classic TV and film soundtracks. According to one obituary, "his list of credits read like a Who's Who of American popular music of the last 60 years".

Biography
Born into a show-business family in New Orleans and raised in the Tremé district, Palmer started his career at five as a tap dancer, joining his mother and aunt on the black vaudeville circuit in its twilight and touring the country extensively with Ida Cox's Darktown Scandals Review. His father is thought to have been the local pianist and bandleader Walter "Fats" Pichon.

Palmer was 12 when he headlined a floor show at the Rhythm Club in New Orleans, "a very beautiful spot where one can enjoy a floor show, headed by Alvin Howey and Little Earl Palmer".

Palmer served in the United States Army during World War II and was posted in the European theatre. His biographer wrote,

After the war ended Palmer studied piano and percussion at the Gruenwald School of Music in New Orleans, where he also learned to read music. He started drumming with the Dave Bartholomew Band in the late 1940s. Palmer was known for playing on New Orleans recording sessions, including Fats Domino's "The Fat Man" and "I'm Walkin"  (and several more of Domino's hits), "Tipitina" by Professor Longhair, "Tutti Frutti" by  Little Richard (and most of Richard's hits), "Lawdy Miss Clawdy" by Lloyd Price, and "I Hear You Knocking'" by Smiley Lewis.

His playing on "The Fat Man" featured the backbeat that has come to be the most important element in rock and roll. Palmer said, "That song required a strong afterbeat throughout the whole piece. With Dixieland you had a strong afterbeat only after you got to the shout last chorus…It was sort of a new approach to rhythm music." Reportedly, he was the first to use the word funky, to explain to other musicians that their music should be made more syncopated and danceable.

Palmer left New Orleans for Hollywood in 1957, initially working for Aladdin Records. He soon started working with the Wrecking Crew, a loose-knit group of session musicians who recorded nonstop during their heyday from 1962 to 1968.

The musicians union tracked Palmer playing on 450 dates in 1967 alone.

For more than 30 years he played drums on the soundtracks of many movies and television shows. Amongst the many artists he worked with were Glenn Yarbrough, Frank Sinatra, Phil Spector, Ricky Nelson, Bobby Vee, Ray Charles, Sam Cooke, Eddie Cochran, Ritchie Valens, Bobby Day, Don and Dewey, Jan and Dean, The Beach Boys, Larry Williams, Gene McDaniels, Bobby Darin, Neil Young, 
The Pets, The Byrds when they were still known as The Beefeaters, and B. Bumble and the Stingers. He also played in jazz sessions with David Axelrod, Dizzy Gillespie, Earl Bostic, Onzy Matthews, and Count Basie, and he contributed to blues recordings by B.B. King.

He remained in demand as a drummer throughout the 1970s and 1980s, playing on recordings for albums by Randy Newman, Tom Waits, Bonnie Raitt, Tim Buckley, Little Feat and Elvis Costello.

In 1982, Palmer was elected treasurer of the Local 47 of the American Federation of Musicians. He served until he was defeated in 1984. He was re-elected in 1990.

A biography, Backbeat: Earl Palmer's Story, by Tony Scherman, was published in 1999.

In later years, Palmer played with a jazz trio in Los Angeles.

Palmer is interviewed on screen and appears in performance footage in the 2005 documentary film Make It Funky!, which presents a history of New Orleans music and its influence on rhythm and blues, rock and roll, funk and jazz. In the film, he performs "Rip It Up" with guest vocalist Ivan Neville and house band.

Palmer is also interviewed in the 2008 documentary film about Los Angeles session musicians, The Wrecking Crew.

Palmer died in September 2008, in Banning, California, after a long illness. He is buried at Riverside National Cemetery in Riverside, California.

Personal life
Palmer married four times and had seven children. He is survived by Earl Cyril Palmer Jr., Donald Alfred Palmer, Ronald Raymond Palmer and Patricia Ann Palmer from his marriage to Catherine Palmer; Shelly Margaret Palmer and Pamela Teresa Palmer from his marriage to Susan Joy Weidenpesch; and Penny Yasuko Palmer from his marriage to Yumiko Makino. He married his fourth wife, Jeline, in 2004.

Quotations
 "You could always tell a New Orleans drummer the minute you heard him play his bass drum because he'd have that parade beat connotation."
 Late in his career, Palmer appeared in a music video with the band Cracker on the song "I Hate My Generation". As Addicted to Noise tells the story, "According to Cracker leader David Lowery, when Palmer was asked if he would be able to play along with the songs, he gave Lowery a look and said, 'I invented this shit.'"
 "I've been asked if people could borrow my drums because they like their sound. What the hell, they think the drums play themselves? I said, 'You really want 'em? Really? Okay. Cost you triple scale and cartage.'"
 When asked by Max Weinberg what more of the recording sessions he'd played on Palmer replied, "Don't ask me which ones I played on. I should have done like Hal [Blaine]. Hal used to get gold records for all the things he played on. I never did that, you know. I would like to have a room with all those things in them. It would have been nice—show my grandchildren when they grow up so they don't say, 'Oh shut up old man and sit down.' I could just say, 'Look. I don't have to tell you nothing. There it is.'"

Awards
In 2000, Palmer became one of the first session musicians to be inducted into the Rock and Roll Hall of Fame.

Discography

As leader
 Drumsville (Liberty Records, 1961)
 Percolator Twist (Liberty Records, 1962)

As sideman 
With David Axelrod
 Song of Innocence (Capitol, 1968)
 Songs of Experience (Capitol, 1969)
 Earth Rot (Capitol, 1970)
 Strange Ladies (MCA, 1977)
 Marchin (MCA, 1980)
 David Axelrod (Mo' Wax, 2001)With The Beach Boys The Beach Boys Today! (Capitol, 1965)
 Sunflower (Reprise, 1970)
 L.A. (Light Album) (CBS, 1979)With Glen Campbell The Astounding 12-String Guitar of Glen Campbell (Capitol, 1964)
 Hey Little One (Capitol, 1968)
 The Glen Campbell Goodtime Album (Capitol, 1970)With Sam Cooke Twistin' the Night Away (RCA Victor, 1962)
 Mr. Soul (RCA Victor, 1963)
 Ain't That Good News (RCA Victor, 1964)With José Feliciano 10 to 23 (RCA Victor, 1969)
 That The Spirit Needs (Of Muse And Man) (RCA Victor, 1971)With B.B. King Blues in My Heart (Crown, 1962)
 L.A. Midnight (ABC, 1972)
 Let the Good Times Roll (MCA, 1999)With Peggy Lee Blues Cross Country (Capitol, 1962)
 Make It With You (Capitol, 1970)
 Norma Deloris Egstrom from Jamestown, North Dakota (Capitol, 1972)With The Monkees The Birds, The Bees & The Monkees (Colgems, 1968)
 Head (Colgems, 1968)With Little Richard Here's Little Richard (Speciality, 1957)
 The Fabulous Little Richard (Speciality, 1959)
 The Second Coming (Reprise, 1972)With Lalo Schifrin Music from Mission: Impossible (Dot, 1967)
 There's a Whole Lalo Schifrin Goin' On (Dot, 1968)
 Ins and Outs (Palo Alto, 1982)With others'''
 Arthur Adams, Home Brew (Fantasy, 1975)
 Cannonball Adderley, Accent on Africa (Capitol, 1968)
 Lisa Hartman Black, Lisa Hartman (Kirshner, 1976)
 Tim Buckley, Look at the Fool (Discreet, 1974)
 Keith Carradine, I'm Easy (Asylum, 1976)
 David Clayton-Thomas, David Clayton-Thomas (Columbia, 1972)
 Buddy Collette's Swinging Shepherds, At the Cinema! (Mercury, 1959)
 Priscilla Coolidge, Gypsy Queen (Sussex, 1970)
 Elvis Costello, King of America (F-Beat, 1986)
 Dick Dale, Mr. Eliminator (Capitol, 1964)
 Bobby Darin, Venice Blue (Capitol, 1965)
 Bobby Darin, Bobby Darin Sings The Shadow of Your Smile (Atlantic, 1966)
 Neil Diamond, Tap Root Manuscript (Uni, 1970)
 The 5th Dimension, Living Together, Growing Together (Bell, 1973)
 Willie Dixon, Hidden Charms (Capitol, 1988)
 Deke Dickerson, In 3-Dimensions (Major Label, 2003)
 Fats Domino, Fats Is Back (Reprise, 1968)
 Donovan, 7-Tease (Epic, 1974)
 Duane Eddy, Twistin' And Twangin' (RCA Victor, 1962)
 Harry Edison, Sweets for the Sweet Taste of Love (Vee-Jay, 1964)
 The Everly Brothers, Roots (Warner Bros., 1968)
 Gil Fuller, Gil Fuller & the Monterey Jazz Festival Orchestra featuring Dizzy Gillespie (Pacific Jazz, 1965)
 Tim Hardin, Tim Hardin 1 (Verve, 1966)
 Al Hirt & Lalo Schifrin, Latin in the Horn (RCA Victor, 1966)
 Lightnin' Hopkins, Lightnin' Strikes (Verve Folkways, 1966)
 Lightnin' Hopkins, Something Blue (Verve Forecast, 1967)
 Milt Jackson, Memphis Jackson (Impulse!, 1969)
 Plas Johnson, This Must Be the Plas (Capitol, 1959)
 Gloria Jones, Share My Love (Motown, 1973)
 Eddie Kendricks, The Hit Man (Tamla, 1975)
 Sarah Kernochan, Beat Around the Bush (RCA, 1974)
 Al Kooper, Easy Does It (Columbia, 1970)
 Ketty Lester, Love Letters (Era, 1963)
 Ketty Lester, Ketty Lester (Records By Pete, 1969)
 Little Feat, Down on the Farm (Warner Bros., 1979)
 Julie London, Julie...At Home (Liberty, 1960)
 Jon Lucien, Romantico (Zemajo, 1980)
 Taj Mahal, The Natch'l Blues (Columbia, 1968)
 The Mamas & the Papas, People Like Us (Dunhill, 1971)
 Barry Mann, Survivor (RCA Victor, 1975)
 Teena Marie, Wild and Peaceful (Motown, 1979)
 Teena Marie, Irons in the Fire (Gordy, 1980)
 Maria Muldaur, Waitress in a Donut Shop (Reprise, 1974)
 Maria Muldaur, Sweet Harmony (Reprise, 1976)
 Michael Martin Murphey, Swans Against the Sun (Epic, 1975)
 Michael Nesmith, The Wichita Train Whistle Sings (Dot, 1968)
 Randy Newman, Sail Away (Reprise, 1972)
 Harry Nilsson, The Point (RCA Victor, 1971)
 Van Dyke Parks, Song Cycle (Warner Bros., 1967)
 Billy Preston, Greazee Soul (Soul City, 1963)
 Bonnie Raitt, Takin' My Time (Warner Bros., 1973)
 The Righteous Brothers, Back to Back (Philles, 1965)
 Howard Roberts, Color Him Funky (Capitol, 1963)
 Howard Roberts, H.R. is a Dirty Guitar Player (Capitol, 1963)
 Leon Russell, Looking Back (Olympic, 1973)
 Frank Sinatra, Sinatra and Swingin' Brass (Reprise, 1962)
 Sonny & Cher, Look at Us (Atco, 1965)
 Barbra Streisand, Stoney End (Columbia, 1971)
 The Strollers, Swinging Flute in Hi-Fi (Score, 1958)
 Gene Summers, The Ultimate School of Rock & Roll (Crystal Clear Sound, 1997)
 Jim Sullivan, U.F.O. (Monnie, 1969)
 Ike & Tina Turner, River Deep – Mountain High (London, 1966)
 Sarah Vaughan, A Time in My Life (Mainstream, 1971)
 Eddie "Cleanhead" Vinson, The Original Cleanhead (BluesTime, 1970)
 Tom Waits, Blue Valentine (Asylum, 1978)
 Joe Williams, With Love (Temponic, 1972)
 Neil Young, Neil Young (Reprise, 1969)

 Singles 

 "The Fat Man" – Fats Domino (1949)
 "Messy Bessy" – Dave Bartholomew (1949)
 "Lawdy Miss Clawdy" – Lloyd Price (1952)
 "I'm Gone" – Shirley and Lee (1952)
 "Doin' the Hambone" b/w "Thinkin' 'Bout My Baby" – James Booker (1954)
 "In the Night" – Professor Longhair (1954)
 "I Hear You Knockin" – Smiley Lewis (1955)
 "Blue Monday" – Fats Domino (1955)
 "The Girl Can't Help It", "Rip It Up", "Long Tall Sally",   "Slippin' and Slidin'", "Ready Teddy" – Little Richard (1956)
 "Chicken Shack Boogie" – Amos Milburn (1956)
 "Ooh-Wee-Baby" – Art Neville (1956)
 "Let the Good Times Roll" – Shirley and Lee (1956)
 "Red Hot" – Bob Luman (1957)
 "You Send Me" – Sam Cooke (1957)
 "I'm Walkin'" – Fats Domino (1957)
 "I'm Leaving It Up to You" – Don and Dewey (1957)
 "Little Bitty Pretty One" – Bobby Day and Thurston Harris (1957)
 "Busy, Busy", "My Heaven" – Dan Bowden (1958)
 "Donna" – Ritchie Valens (1958)
 "Summertime Blues" – Eddie Cochran (1958)
 "Slow Down", "Dizzy Miss Lizzy", "Bony Moronie" – Larry Williams (1958)
 "Polly Molly", "Forever and a Day" – 5 Masks (1958)
 "Patricia Darling", "Whatta You Do" – Ray Willis (1958)
 "Nervous", "Gotta Lotta That", "Twixteen", "Crazy Cat Corner" – Gene Summers (1958)
 "Rockin' Robin" – Bobby Day (1958)
 "Willie and the Hand Jive" – Johnny Otis (1958)
 "La Bamba" – Ritchie Valens (1959)
 "Hippy Hippy Shake" – Chan Romero (1959)
 "Made In The Shade" – Jimmy & Alton (1959)
 "Walking to New Orleans" – Fats Domino (1960)
 "Percolator Twist" – Billy Joe And The Checkmates (1961)
 "The Lonely Bull" – Herb Alpert (1962)
 "High Flyin' Bird" – Judy Henske (1963)
 "Please Let Me Love You" – The Beefeaters (who later became the Byrds) (1964)
 "The Little Old Lady from Pasadena", "Dead Man's Curve" – Jan and Dean (1964)
 "You've Lost That Lovin' Feelin'" – The Righteous Brothers (1964)
 "Please Let Me Wonder" – The Beach Boys (1965)
 "Hold Me, Thrill Me, Kiss Me" – Mel Carter (1965)
 "River Deep - Mountain High" – Ike & Tina Turner (1966)
 "I'll Be Back Up On My Feet", "We Were Made for Each Other", "Magnolia Simms" – The Monkees (1968)
 "The Old Laughing Lady", "I've Loved Her So Long" – Neil Young (1969)
 "She Gets Me Where I Live", "God Sheds His Grace on Thee"  – Al Kooper (1970)
 "It's About Time" - The Beach Boys (1970)
 "Whistlin' Past the Graveyard", "Sweet Little Bullet From a Pretty Blue Gun" – Tom Waits (1978)

Film scores
Palmer was the session drummer for a number of film scores, including:

1961Judgment at Nuremberg, score by Ernest Gold
1963Hud, score by Elmer BernsteinIt's a Mad, Mad, Mad, Mad World, score by Ernest Gold
1964Baby the Rain Must Fall, score by Elmer BernsteinRide the Wild Surf, score by Stu PhillipsRobin and the Seven Hoods, score by Nelson Riddle

1965Boeing Boeing, score by Neal HeftiHarlow, score by Neal HeftiHow to Stuff a Wild Bikini, score by Les BaxterA Patch of Blue, score by Jerry Goldsmith
1967Pretty Polly, score by Michel LegrandCool Hand Luke, score by Lalo SchifrinIn the Heat of the Night, score by Quincy Jones
1968A Dandy in Aspic, score by Quincy Jones

Television scores
Palmer was also the session drummer for a number of television show themes and soundtracks, including:

 The Flintstones M Squad 77 Sunset Strip Bourbon Street Beat Hawaiian Eye Peyton Place I Dream of Jeannie The Man from U.N.C.L.E. Green Acres Ironside The Outsider It Takes a Thief The Leslie Uggams Show The Brady Bunch Delta The Partridge Family The Odd Couple The Pearl Bailey Show M*A*S*H The Midnight Special Mannix Mission: Impossible''

1952

1955

1956

1957

1958

1959

1960

1961

1962

1963

References

External links
 
 
 
 Earl Palmer NAMM Oral History Program Interview (2002)

1924 births
2008 deaths
American jazz drummers
American rock drummers
American session musicians
Rhythm and blues musicians from New Orleans
Jazz musicians from New Orleans
Vaudeville performers
Liberty Records artists
The Wrecking Crew (music) members
Rhythm and blues drummers
Burials at Riverside National Cemetery
20th-century American drummers
American male drummers
20th-century American male musicians
American male jazz musicians
United States Army personnel of World War II